Kitching Ridge is a prominent rock ridge on the west side of Shackleton Glacier, between Bennett Platform and Matador Mountain, in the Queen Maud Mountains of Antarctica. It was named by the Advisory Committee on Antarctic Names for South African vertebrate paleontologist James W. Kitching who first found fossils here. Kitching was an exchange scientist with the Ohio State University Institute of Polar Studies 1970–71 geological party to the Queen Maud Mountains.

References

Ridges of the Ross Dependency
Dufek Coast